David MacBrayne is a limited company owned by the Scottish Government. Formed in 1851 as the private shipping company David Hutcheson & Co. with three partners, David Hutcheson, Alexander Hutcheson and David MacBrayne, it passed in 1878 to David MacBrayne. 

It became the main carrier for freight and passengers in the Hebrides, with a co-ordinated network of shipping, road haulage and bus operations. In 1973, it was merged with Caledonian Steam Packet Company as state-owned Caledonian MacBrayne. Since 2006 it has been the holding company for ferry operators CalMac Ferries Ltd (operating as Caledonian MacBrayne) and Argyll Ferries, and is classified as an executive non-departmental public body of the Scottish Government.

Formation
In 1851, Burns Brothers, G. and J. Burns of Glasgow, passed their fleet of Hebridean vessels to their chief clerk, David Hutcheson. David Hutcheson was married to Margaret Dawson, who was born at her parents home 'Bonnytoun House' in Linlithgow. She was the sister of Adam Dawson, who owned the St. Magdalene Whisky Distillery in Linlithgow, and sister to James Dawson, who were also born at 'Bonnytoun House'. In 2011 Glasgow historian Robert Pool added over 200 letters and documents to his collection relating to David Hutcheson and the Dawson family.

The new company, David Hutcheson & Co., had three partners, David Hutcheson, Alexander Hutcheson and David MacBrayne (1817-1907), nephew of Messrs. Burns. In 1878, the company passed to David MacBrayne (and was renamed David MacBrayne).

The company rapidly became the main carrier on the West Highland routes, providing passenger and freight services to most islands. It initially operated from Glasgow down the Firth of Clyde through the Crinan Canal to Oban and Fort William, and on through the Caledonian Canal to Inverness. It added the mail run to Islay, Harris and North Uist from Skye and then the Outer Isles run from Oban to Barra and South Uist. As each opened, the company added the railheads at Oban, Mallaig, Kyle of Lochalsh and Strome Ferry.

MacBraynes remained in the hands of the family until 1928, when it was unable to support a bid for the renewal of the mail contract and effectively became bankrupt. No other operator was found for the contract and the company was reformed, with ownership divided between Coast Lines and the London, Midland and Scottish Railway (LMS).

Expansion

In 1948 the shares in the company owned by the LMS Railway passed to the British Transport Commission, thus partially nationalising it.

In 1964, the rising number of motor vehicles led to the ordering of three purpose-built vessels,  and MV Columba for the Uig-Tarbert-Lochmaddy, Mallaig-Armadale and Oban-Craignure-Lochaline routes.

Bus services

Motor bus services began with a Fort William to Ballachulish route in 1906, and by the outbreak of the First World War several other bus routes had been established around Inverness, Fort William and Ardrishaig.  No routes actually connected these detached operations with each other at that stage, and road operations remained a very small part of the business until after the reconstituting of the company in 1928. The new owners provided capital to modernise the business, including setting up a substantial road haulage division to replace cargo shipping services at many of the smaller ports.  Expansion of the bus division was gradual, and mainly achieved by acquisition of existing small operators.

In 1929 Link Line of Glasgow introduced a coach route from Glasgow to Tarbert (Kintyre) in competition with MacBrayne's steamer service, and MacBrayne quickly responded by introducing its own coach service, which would become one of the firm's principal routes.  Coaches were timed to connect at Tarbert with MacBrayne's steamer to Islay and McConnachie of Campbeltown's bus service to that town. Link Line sold out to MacBrayne in 1932 ending the competition, although from 1935 onward West Coast Motors of Campbeltown provided an overnight passenger and mail coach service between Campbeltown and Glasgow.  MacBrayne's own buses did not reach Campbeltown until 1940, when they replaced the Glasgow to Campbeltown steamer. MacBraynes and West Coast co-existed on the route thereafter.

Another significant takeover was of Shields of Kinlochleven in 1934. Shields operated a service from Fort William to Tyndrum, where a connection could be made with W. Alexander & Sons' Oban to Glasgow (via Helensburgh) service.  MacBrayne extended some journeys on this route through to Glasgow (via Luss), although connections with the Alexander service also continued.  McIntyre of Fort William was acquired in 1936, giving MacBrayne an interest in the Fort William to Fort Augustus route, and through services between Fort William and Inverness were finally introduced in 1939 following cessation of the Fort Augustus to Inverness steamer. 

This important route was jointly operated with Macrae & Dick of Inverness (a Highland Omnibuses predecessor). Various other small operators were taken over in the 1930s and 1940s, expanding or consolidating the route network on the mainland. Most MacBrayne bus services carried parcels and in some cases mail as well as passengers.  In addition to the stage carriage routes, MacBraynes developed a significant coach tour operation in the West Highlands, often operated in conjunction with the firm's pleasure steamers.

On the islands served by MacBrayne steamers, connecting bus services were provided by local independent operators, but from 1941 onwards MacBrayne began to take over many of these businesses and to operate the buses themselves. Firms so acquired were McGibbon of Bowmore (Islay) in 1941, MacKinnon of Askernish (South Uist) in 1947, Ferguson of Clachan (South Uist) in 1947, MacLean & Donald of Ardvasar (Skye) in 1948, MacDonald of Sollas (North Uist) in 1948, Skye Transport (a Scottish Co-operative Wholesale Society subsidiary) of Portree (Skye) in 1958, Cameron of Tarbert (Harris) in 1964, Cowe of Tobermory (Mull) in 1964 and finally Carson of Dunvegan (Skye) in 1970. 

Postwar expansion on the mainland included a detached operation on the Ardgour Peninsula.  When Ardgour and Acharacle Motor Services ceased trading at the end of 1950, MacBaynes took over their services connecting Acharacle and Kilchoan with the Corran Ferry, by which means onward connection could be made with MacBrayne's buses for Fort William or Glasgow. MacBraynes also took over operation of the ferry itself in 1954.  Another acquisition on the mainland was Campbell of Glenshiel in 1960, with the route from Inverness to Kyle of Lochalsh and a connecting service from Shiel Bridge to Glenelg.

Due to the highly dispersed nature of its operations, the MacBrayne bus fleet used a remarkably large number of bus depots relative to its size, none of which was particularly large and many of which were simply small sheds for overnight parking of one vehicle.  For example, the five-vehicle operation on Islay had a depot at Port Ellen and overnight sheds at Port Askaig and Portnahaven. Many garage facilities were shared with the company's road haulage fleet. The largest bus depot was Fort William, and other larger facilities were at Ardrishaig, Glasgow, Inverness, Kinlochleven, and Portree.

Divestments and merger

In July 1969, Coast Line's 50% shareholding passed into state ownership, the company becoming a wholly nationalised subsidiary within the Scottish Transport Group. It was then decided to split MacBraynes shipping, road haulage and bus divisions into separate undertakings.  The company's bus and coach services were transferred to the Scottish Bus Group in stages during 1970–72.  The Glasgow-based coach tours passed to Alexander (Midland), the Ardrishaig depot including the Glasgow-Campbeltown and Ardrishaig-Oban routes passed to Western SMT, but the bulk of the bus operations passed to Highland Omnibuses (as did Alexander (Midland)'s Oban depot). Highland divested itself of some of the most peripheral routes within a few years, including all of the island operations except those on Skye. The road haulage division became MacBrayne Haulage Ltd., which was privatised and absorbed by Kilcionan Transport in 1985.

On 1 January 1973 the Scottish Transport Group's other shipping company, the Clyde-based Caledonian Steam Packet Company Ltd., acquired most of the ships and routes of David MacBrayne Ltd., and commenced joint Clyde and West Highland operations under the new name of Caledonian MacBrayne, with a combined headquarters at Gourock.

Reactivation
After lying dormant for a number of years, the David MacBrayne Ltd. company was reactivated in 2006 by Scottish Ministers to act as the holding company for state-owned ferry operators. Scottish Ministers are the sole shareholder of the group, and all subsidiaries are private companies. The company is now categorised as an Executive Non Departmental Public Body (ENDPB) of the Scottish Government.

The group consisted of ferry operators CalMac Ferries Ltd, which (as Caledonian MacBrayne) operates the Clyde and Hebrides services and NorthLink Ferries Ltd, the former operator of the Aberdeen - Kirkwall - Lerwick and Scrabster - Stromness services. In 2011, newly created operator Argyll Ferries Ltd, which operated the Dunoon - Gourock passenger service was added to the group. In May 2012, NorthLink Ferries Ltd lost the Northern Isles ferry service contract to Serco. From 21 January 2019 the Argyll Ferries service was transferred into the existing Caledonian MacBrayne Clyde and Hebrides Ferry Service contract.

The vessels and piers used by the ferry operators are owned by Caledonian Maritime Assets Limited (CMAL), which is also owned by the Scottish Government. CMAL leases the vessels and piers to the operating companies for the duration of the contracts. The ships are chartered to the relevant ferry operators, and the piers and harbours operated under fairly standard berthing charges.

Ships of David MacBrayne
MacBrayne ships featured red funnels with a black top. She was an early steel-hulled 301-foot vessel, built by J & G Thomson in 1878, and was the largest and most luxurious Clyde steamer of the day; she operated the Glasgow to Ardrishaig service as part of MacBrayne's  "Royal Route" to Oban. Her successor on the route, SS St Columba was the largest Turbine Steamer built for service on the Clyde and remains the only three-funnelled steamer ever to have served on the river.

List of ships operated by the company

Source

Footnotes

External links
 David MacBrayne website

 
Ferry companies of Scotland
Executive non-departmental public bodies of the Scottish Government
Transport in the Outer Hebrides
Transport in Argyll and Bute
Transport in Highland (council area)
Transport in Inverclyde
British companies established in 1851
1851 establishments in Scotland
1973 disestablishments in Scotland
Re-established companies
Companies established in 2006
2006 establishments in Scotland
Cowal
Firth of Clyde
Highlands and Islands of Scotland
Inner Hebrides
Scottish coast
Transport companies established in 1851